The Circuit Goodyear is a motor racing circuit in Colmar-Berg, Luxembourg. The circuit is owned and used as a testing venue by the Goodyear Tire and Rubber Company.

History
The facility is mostly used as a centre for driver training, with learner drivers in Luxembourg required to pass a course on the circuit before obtaining their licence.

Circuit Goodyear has been used for racing only once, a round of the 2016 TCR Benelux Touring Car Championship. A chicane was placed at the end of the main straight due to the risks posed by cars heading into the regular first corner at high speed, however the alternate layout saw a large accident between Stefano Comini and Vincent Radermecker and racing has not returned since.

Lap records

References

External links
High Speed Racing Club Luxembourg website

Motorsport venues